Arturo Tanaquin (born 20 January 1941) is a Filipino former wrestler who competed in the 1972 Summer Olympics.

References

1941 births
Living people
Filipino male sport wrestlers
Olympic wrestlers of the Philippines
Wrestlers at the 1972 Summer Olympics
Wrestlers at the 1974 Asian Games
Asian Games competitors for the Philippines